Angoon Seaplane Base  is a state-owned public-use seaplane base located one nautical mile (2 km) southeast of the central business district of Angoon, a city on Admiralty Island in the Hoonah-Angoon Census Area of the U.S. state of Alaska. Scheduled airline service is subsidized by the Essential Air Service program.

As per the Federal Aviation Administration, this airport had 1,770 passenger enplanements (boardings) in calendar year 2008, 1,750 in 2009, and 1,680 in 2010. The National Plan of Integrated Airport Systems for 2015-2019 categorized it as a general aviation airport, based on 1,743 enplanements in 2012 (the commercial service category requires at least 2,500 enplanements per year).

Facilities and aircraft
Angoon Seaplane Base has one seaplane landing area designated NW/SE which measures 10,000 by 900 feet (3,048 x 274 m). For the 12-month period ending December 31, 2006, the airport had 1,150 aircraft operations, an average of 95 per month: 87% air taxi and 13% general aviation.

Airlines and destinations
The following airline offers scheduled passenger service:

Statistics

See also
 Tenakee Seaplane Base

References

Other sources

 Essential Air Service documents (Docket DOT-OST-2006-25542) from the U.S. Department of Transportation:
 90-Day Notice (August 1, 2006): of Alaska Juneau Aeronautics, Inc. d/b/a Wings of Alaska of intent to terminate Essential Air Service at Angoon and Tenakee, Alaska.
 Order 2006-9-17 (September 19, 2006): allowing Alaska Juneau Aeronautics, Inc., d/b/a Wings of Alaska, to suspend its unsubsidized scheduled service at Angoon and Tenakee, Alaska, on September 23, 2006.
 90-Day Notice (October 6, 2008): of Alaska Seaplane Service, LLC to terminate all scheduled service at Angoon and Tenakee, Alaska.
 Order 2008-12-27 (December 29, 2008): selecting Alaska Seaplane Service, LLC, to provide essential air service (EAS) at annual subsidy rate of $101,359 at Angoon and $63,748 at Tenakee, Alaska, through January 31, 2011.
 Order 2010-12-7 (December 3, 2010): reselected Alaska Seaplane Service, LLC, to provide essential air service (EAS) at Angoon and Tenakee, Alaska, at annual subsidy rates of $145,734 at Angoon and $135,576 at Tenakee, from February 1, 2011, through January 31, 2015.
 Order 2011-3-18 (March 15, 2011): amends the payout formula for Angoon and Tenakee.

External links
 Topographic map from USGS The National Map

Airports in the Hoonah–Angoon Census Area, Alaska
Essential Air Service
Seaplane bases in Alaska